The Kortrijk–Bossuit Canal (Dutch: Kanaal Kortrijk-Bossuit, French: Canal Bossuit-Courtrai) is a canal in western Belgium, which connects the city of Kortrijk to village of Bossuit.  It forms a direct link between the river Leie and the river Scheldt.

Canals in Flanders
Canals in West Flanders
Geography of Kortrijk
Avelgem
Canals opened in 1860